Dorcadion alexandris is a species of beetle in the family Cerambycidae. It was described by Pic in 1900.

See also 
 Dorcadion

References

alexandris
Beetles described in 1900